The Devil is a Sissy is a 1936 American MGM comedy-drama film  directed by W. S. Van Dyke and Rowland Brown. The film stars Freddie Bartholomew, Jackie Cooper and Mickey Rooney, three of the biggest child stars of the 1930s.

The film premiered on September 18, 1936.

Plot
Claude Pierce is an aristocratic and well-bred boy from England, whose parents have received a divorce. According to a child custody agreement signed by his parents, Claude will spend six months living with his father. Jay Pierce, the father in question, has settled in New York City, where he works as an architect. Claude starts attending a public school in New York City.

Claude's "polished" manners make him stand out among his schoolmates, and the other kids start playing pranks on him. He soon gets on the bad side of two lower-class kids, Robert "Buck" Murphy and James "Gig" Stevens. Gig is in a dark mood at the time, because his father is about to be executed for murder. Finding himself the target of the other boys' anger, Claude decides to learn self-defense. Claude takes boxing lessons, which help him beat Buck in a street fight. He wins his opponent's grudging respect and starts befriending his former tormentors.

At a later point, Gig's father has already been executed at the electric chair, and Gig lacks the money to provide a headstone for his father's grave. He really wants to buy that headstone and starts seeking ways to earn enough money for it. Gig initially tries to get money from his aunt Rose Hawley, who is a kept woman and financially secure. He fails to explain what he intends to do with the money, so Rose refuses to help him. Gig decides to raise the money by stealing, and convinces his friend Buck to help him. However, their initial attempts at crime fail.

Claude learns of the problem, and instructs his new friends to start "stealing from the rich" and to emulate a fictional role model, gentleman thief A. J. Raffles. Claude personally orchestrates a robbery at a house that is vacant and unguarded. The trio steal toys which they can sell at a pawn shop to raise money. The robbery and visit to the pawn shop go as planned, but the three juvenile delinquents are then arrested by a police officer who finds their activities suspicious.

The boys appear at court, where it is noted that nobody has reported the robbery. Claude explains that it was a fake robbery to begin with. He led his friends into looting his own house, and those toys belonged to Claude himself. He was just trying to help them out. The judge finds Claude innocent of any actual crime, but still finds that Buck and Gig acted with criminal intent. He places the two boys on probation, and they now have to make regular reports to a probation officer. Buck and Gig blame Claude for their fate and angrily sever ties with him.

Buck and Gig decide to become runaways and flee from their families and their probation officer. Claude learns of their plans and decides to follow them, in hopes of convincing them to return home. Claude shows symptoms of illness at this point, but he attributes them to a common cold and pays no attention to them. The three boys meet at the local cemetery, under heavy rain. They check the recently-erected gravestone for Gig's father.

The boys hitch-hike and are picked by a passing vehicle. The vehicle belongs to a trio of criminals trying to escape the authorities, and the boys distrust their intentions. The six of them stop for a meal at a diner, where Claude covertly alerts the police. While the criminals face the police in a shootout, the boys escape. Claude's symptoms are getting worse, and he has both fever and delirium. Buck and Gig are getting worried and decide to take Claude to a hospital. Claude is diagnosed with pneumonia.

As Buck and Gig decide to get in contact with their probation officer, Claude is visited by his mother Hilda Pierce. Hilda wants to transfer Claude to a better hospital, but her plan seems to backfire. Claude's condition gets worse following the transport. Buck and Gig decide to tell their seemingly dying friend how much they care for him. The encouragement apparently helps in Claude's recovery. The film ends with the three boys happily going on a bicycle ride.

Cast
 Freddie Bartholomew as  Claude 'Limey' Pierce
 Jackie Cooper as  Robert 'Buck' Murphy
 Mickey Rooney as  James 'Gig' Stevens
 Ian Hunter as  Jay Pierce
 Katharine Alexander as  Hilda Pierce
 Peggy Conklin as  Rose Hawley
 Gene Lockhart as Mr. Jim 'Murph' Murphy
 Kathleen Lockhart as  Mrs. Murphy
 Jonathan Hale as Judge Holmes
 Etienne Girardot as  Mr. Crusenberry, the Principal
 Sherwood Bailey as  Bugs
 Buster Slaven as Six-Toes
 Grant Mitchell as  Paul Krumpp
 Stanley Fields as Joe, a Gangster
 Harold Huber as  Willie, a Gangster
 Frank Puglia as  'Grandma', a Gangster
 Etta McDaniel as  Molly, Rose's Maid

Production

The screen credits of the film contain a spelling error. The name of the film's cinematographer, George Schneiderman, is spelled with two ns in the credits.

A 1936 review of the film by the magazine Variety contains an error in the description of the film's duration. The review claims that the film lasts for 131 minutes. Most other sources report that the film only lasts for 92 minutes.

The film is apparently based on a screenplay called The Devil Is a Sissie, which screenwriters Rowland Brown and Frank Frenton were working on in 1935. Brown is the one credited as the main writer of the film, with the extent of Fenton's contribution unclear. Other screenwriters were responsible for the final form of the screenplay.

Publicity for the film focused on the change in directors in mid-production. Initially Rowland Brown was announced as the sole director of the film. During filming, came news reports that director W. S. Van Dyke was hired to "assist" Brown. A few days later, it was announced that Van Dyke had replaced Brown as the sole director of the film. The reasons of the replacement were not explained. According to the American Film Institute, this was the fourth time that Brown had started directing a film, only to be replaced by another director in mid-production.

While Rowland Brown is still credited as co-director of the film in several sources, apparently only one or two scenes of the film were directed by him. According to 1936 news reports, most of the scenes that Brown had filmed were discarded and had to be reshot by W. S. Van Dyke. The official credits of the film name Van Dyke as sole director.

References

External links
 
 
 
 

1936 films
1936 comedy-drama films
American black-and-white films
American comedy-drama films
Films about children
Films directed by Rowland Brown
Films directed by W. S. Van Dyke
Films scored by Herbert Stothart
Films set in New York City
Medical-themed films
Metro-Goldwyn-Mayer films
Films with screenplays by Cyril Hume
1930s English-language films
1930s American films
Films with screenplays by Richard Schayer